In Heat is the fourth studio album by the American glam metal band Black 'n Blue. It was produced by Kiss bassist Gene Simmons.

Track listing
Side one
 "Rock On" (Gene Simmons, Jaime St. James, Tommy Thayer) – 3:45
 "Sight for Sore Eyes" (Simmons, St. James, Thayer, Pat Regan) – 3:31
 "Heat It Up! Burn It Out!" (St. James, Thayer, Jeff Warner) – 4:21
 "Suspicious" (St. James, Thayer, Regan) – 3:42
 "The Snake" (St. James, Thayer) – 4:41

Side two
"Live It Up" (Simmons, St. James, Warner) – 3:37
 "Gimme Your Love" (Adam Mitchell, St. James, Thayer) – 3:45
 "Get Wise to the Rise" (St. James, Thayer) – 4:36
 "Great Guns of Fire" (St. James, Thayer) – 4:37
 "Stranger" (Simmons, St. James) – 4:33

Personnel
Black 'n Blue
 Jaime St. James – vocals
 Tommy Thayer – lead guitar
 Jeff Warner – rhythm guitar
 Patrick Young – bass
 Pete Holmes – drums

Additional musicians
John Purdell, Pat Regan – keyboards

Production
Gene Simmons – producer
Pat Regan – associate producer on tracks 2 and 4
Dave Wittman – engineer, mixing
Adam Yellin, Andrew Udoff, Danny Mormando, David Reitzas, Jon Magnusson, Scott Mabuchi – assistant engineers
George Marino – mastering at Sterling Sound, New York
Hugh Syme – art direction and design
John Kalodner – A&R

References

Black 'n Blue albums
1988 albums
Albums produced by Gene Simmons
Geffen Records albums
Albums recorded at Electric Lady Studios